Henrique Dias (died 8 June 1662) was a Portuguese soldier and militia leader born in the colony of Brazil. There is no consensus among historians whether he was born free or captive.

Military career 
Dias led a military regiment composed of enslaved and freed slaves and was known as "Governor of the Blacks" in 1636. Dias defended Portuguese settlements from Dutch forces and played important roles in the First and Second Battles of Guararapes, in the defense of Salvador, Bahia, and to restore Portuguese control over Pernambuco. Dias' title was expanded to "Governor of All Creoles, Blacks, and Mulattoes," in 1639.

It is debated whether Dias received nobility status within Brazil, some believe Dias was granted Knighthood in The Order of Christ, while others debate Dias never received this title and requested knighthood be granted to the men who marry his daughters. Dias traveled to Portugal and petitioned the crown to grant his requests. Dias requested the enslaved blacks who served with him be freed should have "all the rights and privileges of white units". Dias also requested to be compensated for his efforts and allowed to serve as long as he wished.

See also
Colonial Brazil
Dutch Brazil
Research Materials: Max Planck Society Archive

References

Further reading
Allen, Judith L. "Henrique Dias" in Encyclopedia of Latin American History and Culture, vol. 2, p. 375. New York: Charles Scribner's Sons 1996.
Boxer, C.R., The Dutch in Brazil, 1624-1654. 1957.
Gonsalves de Mello, José Antonio. Henrique Dias: Governador dos pretos, crioulos, e mulatos do estado do Brasil. 1954
Mattos, Hebe. "Black Troops and Hierarchies of Color in the Portuguese Atlantic World: The Case of Henrique Dias and his Black Regiment," Luso-Brazilian Review Volume 45, Number 1, 2008
Pita, Sebastião da Rocha, História da América Portuguesa, Ed. Itatiaia, 1976 
Russell-Wood, A.J.R. The Black Man in Slavery and Freedom in Colonial Brazil. 1982.

External links
 
History of Portuguese America, in Portuguese, by Sebastião da Rocha Pita

1662 deaths
Knights of the Military Order of Christ
Colonial Brazil
People of the Dutch–Portuguese War
Year of birth unknown